The Majority Social Democratic Party of Germany (MSPD) was the name officially used by the Social Democratic Party of Germany (SPD) during the period 1917–1922. This differentiated it from the more left wing Independent Social Democratic Party of Germany (USPD). Nevertheless they were often simply called the SPD.

The split 
Prior to the war there had been much discussion about opposing the impending war amongst the SPD, but once the war started the SPD agreed on a political truce or Burgfriedenspolitik whereby despite their disagreements none of the MPs voted against war credits.
Originally even Karl Liebknecht only abstained, although in 1914 he voted against war credits. Then in December 1915 20 MPs from the SPD issued a statement in the Reichstag against the truce. Those 20 MPs from the SPD opposed the war loans in the chamber.

During the revolution 
Gustav Noske of the MSPD recruited the right-wing nationalist Freikorps to suppress the Spartacist uprising and the Bavarian Soviet Republic in 1919. Noske was later appointed as the first Reichswehr Minister of the Weimar Republic. He was politically responsible for numerous murders committed by the Freikorps on many known and unknown revolutionaries, including the murder of Rosa Luxemburg and Karl Liebknecht on 15 January 1919 by Freikorps soldiers led by Waldemar Pabst.

Reunification 
On 24 September 1922, the parties officially merged again after a joint party convention in Nuremberg, adopting the name  (VSPD, "United Social Democratic Party of Germany"), which was shortened again to SPD in 1924.

References 

1917 establishments in Germany
1922 disestablishments in Germany
Defunct socialist parties in Germany
Organizations of the German Revolution of 1918–1919
Political parties disestablished in 1922
Political parties established in 1917
Political parties in the Weimar Republic
Political parties of the German Empire
Social Democratic Party of Germany
Social democratic parties in Germany